Podkowa Leśna  (literal meaning – "Forest Horseshoe", in full: Miasto-ogród Podkowa Leśna – "Garden-City Podkowa Leśna") is a town in Grodzisk Mazowiecki County, Masovian Voivodeship of Poland and located within the territory of the Młochowskie Forests. Town status – since 1 January 1969. The town also has the status of gmina, meaning "commune". Population – ca. 4000. 

Founded in 1925. On 1 September 1939 bombs fell on Podkowa Leśna that the Luftwaffe had intended for Warsaw. On 17 January 1945 the Soviets entered Podkowa Leśna.

Located in a beautiful setting not far from Warsaw, the town has an interesting collection of villas dating back to the interwar period, along with newly built modern family homes and mansions. Forests surround the city on three sides from the east, south, and north. Peacocks freely wonder around the town. It is considered by some to be "Warsaw's bedroom" given its relaxing, natural environment and close proximity to the capital of Poland, Warsaw. 

The town was designed in 1925 by Anthony Jawornicki and is based on the principles of the Garden city movement. Its growth was aided by the construction of the Warsaw Commuter Railway in 1927 which has 3 stations located in the town. Due to the town being served by this light railway line, it is easily accessed from central Warsaw.

It is historically has attracted residents from the arts, culture and politics and is increasingly popular with wealthy professionals and business people. The town is one of the wealthiest in Poland.

Town Layout

There is a small town centre consisting of numerous amenities such as a church, bank, post office, wine shop, numerous delicatessens, police station, veterinarian and numerous restaurants. Just beyond the edge of the forest to the North West is a modern shopping centre called "Galeria Podkowa".  

There are 3 schools in the town, junior, primary and high school.

Popular Culture
The 2021 movie "In For a Murder" was set in Podkowa Leśna

Smart City
In 2018, Podkowa Leśna was selected as an model Orange Smart City. Fibre to the property FTTP is available to residents and offers speeds of up to 1GB/s

Gallery

See also
 , founder of the town
Warsaw Commuter Railway 
Jarosław Iwaszkiewicz

References

External links

 
 Jewish Community in Podkowa Leśna on Virtual Shtetl

Cities and towns in Masovian Voivodeship
Grodzisk Mazowiecki County